John Morgan (c. 1641–1 January 1715) was a Welsh merchant, sheriff and MP (for Monmouth Boroughs).

He was born the fourth son of Thomas Morgan (of Machen) and established himself as a London merchant, acquiring a large fortune trading with the West Indies. His brother was William Morgan.

Determined to leave London and return to his native shire he purchased Rhiwperra Castle from a cousin as his home for 12,400 pounds. He was appointed High Sheriff of Monmouthshire in 1697.

In 1701 he was elected to Parliament to represent Monmouth Boroughs until 1705. In 1705 he contested and lost the election for knight of the shire (MP) for Monmouthshire.

He died in 1715 and was buried at Machen, Monmouthshire. He never married and left his estate to his nephew John Morgan (of Rhiwpera), whereby it became part of estates of the Tredegar Morgans.

References

 MORGAN, John I (c.1641-1715), of Ruperra, Glam.
Welsh Biography online - MORGAN family, of Tredegar Park, etc., Mon.

1715 deaths
High Sheriffs of Monmouthshire
Year of birth uncertain
17th-century Welsh politicians
18th-century Welsh politicians
English MPs 1701–1702
English MPs 1702–1705
1640s births
17th-century Welsh businesspeople
18th-century Welsh businesspeople